Little Rock Southwest High School, also known as Little Rock Southwest Magnet High School, is a public high school in southwest Little Rock, Arkansas.

Groundbreaking occurred in 2017. It replaced J. A. Fair Systems Magnet High School and McClellan Magnet High School. Additionally it took over the attendance area for Hall High School, which was converted into Hall STEAM Magnet High School, a magnet only school.

It has  of space. There are 65 classrooms, with each having  of space. It opened as scheduled in 2020. It had 1,930 students in September 2020.

References

External links
 Little Rock Southwest High School
 Attendance boundary

High schools in Little Rock, Arkansas
Public high schools in Arkansas
2020 establishments in Arkansas
Educational institutions established in 2020
Schools in the Little Rock School District